The Nebraska Cranes were a United States Basketball League team located in Kearney, Nebraska. The most recent head coach was Brian Walsh. In the team's second season, the Cranes won the USBL championship by defeating the defending champion Dodge City Legend with Nick Galef being named as the Championship MVP.

Their second season turned out to be their last, as they did not return for the 2007 season.

References

External links
USBL League Website
Nebraska Cranes - Discussion Forum

United States Basketball League teams
Basketball teams in Nebraska
Kearney, Nebraska
Sports in the Tri-Cities, Nebraska
Basketball teams established in 2005
Basketball teams disestablished in 2006
2005 establishments in Nebraska
2006 disestablishments in Nebraska